The UK Albums Chart is one of many music charts compiled by the Official Charts Company that calculates the best-selling albums of the week in the United Kingdom. Since 2004 the chart has been based on the sales of both physical albums and digital downloads. This list shows albums that peaked in the top ten of the UK Albums Chart during 2015, as well as albums which peaked in 2014 and 2016 but were in the top ten in 2015. The entry date is when the album appeared in the top ten for the first time (week ending, as published by the Official Charts Company, which is six days after the chart is announced).

One-hundred and sixty-nine albums were in the top 10 this year. Fifteen albums from 2014 remained in the top ten for several weeks at the beginning of the year, while A Head Full of Dreams by Coldplay was released in 2015 but did not reach its peak until 2016. Hozier by Hozier was the only album from 2014 to reach its peak in 2015. James Bay, Jess Glynne, Years & Years and The Weeknd were among the many artists who achieved their first UK charting top-ten album in 2015.

The first new number-one album of the year was Uptown Special by Mark Ronson. Overall, thirty-five different albums peaked at number one in 2015, with thirty-five unique artists hitting that position.

Background

Chart debuts
The following table (collapsed on desktop site) does not include acts who had previously charted as part of a group and secured their first top 10 solo album, or featured appearances on compilations or other artists recordings.

Best-selling albums
Adele had the best-selling album of the year with 25. × by Ed Sheeran came in second place. Sam Smith's In the Lonely Hour, If I Can Dream from Elvis Presley with the Royal Philharmonic Orchestra and Purpose by Justin Bieber made up the top five. Albums by Taylor Swift, Jess Glynne, James Bay, Coldplay and George Ezra were also in the top ten best-selling albums of the year.

Top-ten albums
Key

Entries by artist
The following table shows artists who achieved two or more top 10 entries in 2015, including albums that reached their peak in 2014. The figures only include main artists, with featured artists and appearances on compilation albums not counted individually for each artist. The total number of weeks an artist spent in the top ten in 2015 is also shown.

Notes

 Brothers in Arms originally peaked at number-one upon its initial release in 1985. It re-entered the top 10 at number 8 on 14 February 2015 (week ending) for one week after it was made available at a discounted price on digital music retailers.
 The Very Best of Glenn Miller originally peaked at number 4 upon its initial release in 2010.
 The Very Best of Fleetwood Mac re-entered the top 10 at number 7 on 23 July 2015 (week ending). It originally peaked at number 7 upon its initial release in 2002. The album reached a brand new peak of number 6 in 2009.
 The Definitive Collection originally peaked at number 10 upon its initial release in 2003. It made its ultimate peak of number-one in 2015 following Lionel Richie's performance at that year's Glastonbury festival.
 Amused to Death originally peaked at number 8 upon its initial release in 1992.
 The Very Best of Cilla Black originally peaked outside the top 10 at number 37 upon its initial release in 2013. In 2014, after the transmission of the ITV biopic Cilla, starring Sheridan Smith, the album re-entered the chart and peaked at number 26. It would ultimately make its peak of number-one following Cilla Black's death in August 2015.
 1 originally peaked at number-one upon its initial release in 2000. It re-entered the top 10 at number 5 on 19 November 2015 (week ending) for one week, following the release of the deluxe edition of the album, entitled 1+
 Figure includes album that peaked in 2014.

See also
2015 in British music
List of number-one albums from the 2010s (UK)

References
General

Specific

External links
2015 album chart archive at the Official Charts Company (click on relevant week)

United Kingdom top 10 albums
Top 10 albums
2015